Zapolyariye (Russian Авиапредприятие Зональное) is a defunct Russian airline which was founded in 2007 and based in Norilsk, Keasnoyarsk. It ceased business in 2010 with money owed to staff due to large losses (over 150,000,000 Roubles as of September 2010) and the management's inability to finance the airline.

Routes

The airline formerly operated the following routes:

 Krasnodar - Khabarovsk - Novokuznetsk (НЛ-511)
 Khabarovsk - Novokuznetsk - Anapa (НЛ-414)
 Anapa - Novokuznetsk (НЛ-369)

The airline carried out 688 flights on the above routes in Summer 2010 with 177 delayed

Fleet

References

Defunct airlines of Russia
Airlines established in 2007
Airlines disestablished in 2010
Companies based in Krasnoyarsk Krai